Edgeworth Manor is a Grade II* listed country house in Edgeworth, Gloucestershire, England. It was mentioned in the Domesday Book, when it held by Roger de Lacy. The current house is mainly dated to 1685, when the previous Tudor house was replaced for Nathaniel Ridler. It underwent significant changes to south under Capel N. Tripp in 1882 and Sir Ernest George in 1899.

References

Country houses in Gloucestershire
Grade II* listed houses
Grade II* listed buildings in Gloucestershire
Houses completed in 1685
1685 establishments in England